Rooster Town was a Métis community in Manitoba, Canada, located in modern-day Winnipeg.

This Métis settlement existed from the early 1900s to the late 1950s. The difficulty of procuring affordable housing close to other members of the Métis community had led families to the decision to build their own housing on the land. The peak population of Rooster Town was from about the mid-1930s to 1945, with close to 250 residents. Throughout the 1950s, many residents left under pressure from developers to relocate. In the late 1950s, the remaining families' houses were burnt down or bulldozed to make way for Grant Park Shopping Centre and Grant Park High School. Rooster Town has been described by Lawrie Barkwell, senior historian, Louis Riel Institute, as a "working-class community with a vibrant culture." Recent scholarship, such as the book Rooster Town: The History of an Urban Métis Community, 1901-1961 by Evelyn Peters, Matthew Stock and Adrian Werner and an article by David G. Burley in Urban History Review / Revue d'histoire urbaine  explore the long-hidden history of this community.

References

Further reading

External links

Rooster Town Online Archive

The Outsiders, Winnipeg Free Press

MARL article

History of Winnipeg
Métis in Manitoba